Fort Buhlow is an American Civil War fort site located in Pineville, Louisiana.  It was added to the National Register of Historic Places on June 1, 1981. It was one of two forts built for the Confederate States Army by local plantation slave labor in March 1865 to prevent anticipated Union attacks. Alphonse Buhlow was the military engineer for the construction of the forts and this one was named for him.

See also
 Forts Randolph and Buhlow State Historic Site
 National Register of Historic Places listings in Rapides Parish, Louisiana

References

External links 
 
 
 

Buildings and structures in Rapides Parish, Louisiana
Pineville, Louisiana
Buhlow
Buhlow
National Register of Historic Places in Rapides Parish, Louisiana
1864 establishments in Louisiana